VDA-FS is a CAD data exchange format for the transfer of surface models from one CAD system to another.
Its name is an abbreviation of "", which translates to the "automotive industry association - surface data interface".
Standard was specified by the German organization VDA

VDA-FS has been superseded by STEP, ISO 10303.

See also
VDA 6.1

CAD file formats